Rafik Mohammad Yousef (27 August 1974 – 17 September 2015) was a Kurdish Islamist terrorist who was tried and convicted for plotting to assassinate the Prime Minister of Iraq during  his visit to Germany in 2004, served time, and, after being released from prison, was shot and killed when he attacked a German police officer with a knife in Berlin on 17 September 2015.

Early life
Rafik Yousef was born in Baghdad to a family of Sunni Kurds. He was imprisoned in Iraq for over two years under Saddam Hussein's rule.

After his release from prison, Yousef immigrated to Germany in 1996, living in Mannheim and later in Berlin-Gropiusstadt, where he started a construction business. He had a German travel document. People who knew him described him as an "insane and harried" person; he was also threatened to be banned from a Berlin mosque because of his radical statements.

2004 assassination attempt
In 2004, Yousef and two other Kurds, Ata R. and Mazen H., both of them members of Ansar al-Islam, planned to assassinate Ayad Allawi, while he visited Germany. The assassination was planned to take place during an appearance by Allawi in Berlin at Deutsche Bank on 3 December 2004.

The three were among more than 20 alleged affiliates of Ansar al-Islam, a radical Islamist group linked to al-Qaeda, arrested in Europe in 2004 as security officials asserted that the group was smuggling trained operatives into Europe to carry out attacks. Rafik Yousef personally knew Mullah Krekar and had close ties with him.

The three were convicted of plotting to assassinate Allawi, and sentenced to prison. They were arrested separately on 3 December 2004. Yousef served an eight-year sentence and was freed in 2013, but he was required to wear an electronic ankle monitor. According to Bild newspaper, the monitor had been cut off only hours before Yousef attacked the police officer in 2015.

2015 police officer attack
The attack took place in the Spandau district of Berlin. Police were alerted to a "madman with a knife" who was threatening passersby. As the first police officer arrived at the scene and emerged from her vehicle, Yousef stabbed her in the neck just above her protective vest, her partner immediately drew his gun and shot Yousef four times, killing him.

Conspiracy theory
A conspiracy theory claiming that Yousef is still alive and active began in Italy before spreading to Germany and then to the English-speaking world. It initially purported that Yousef is "Paul H.", the name given to an at-the-time unidentified suspect of a fatal knife attack at Grafing station in Grafing, southern Germany, on 10 May 2016, although later "Paul H." was captured and admitted into a mental hospital. Conspiracy theorists claimed that Yousef's name had been changed as part of a cover-up.

References

1974 births
2015 deaths
Kurdish Islamism
Kurdish Islamists
Prisoners and detainees of Germany
People shot dead by law enforcement officers in Germany
Islamic terrorism in Germany
Stabbing attacks in Germany